Meydan (also Romanized as Meydān) is a village in Chalanchulan Rural District, Silakhor District, Dorud County, Lorestan Province, Iran. At the 2006 census, its population was 421, in 112 families.

References 

Towns and villages in Dorud County